To be bulletproof is to embody a bulletproofing technology.

Bullet proof or bulletproof may also refer to:

Films and Television 
 Bullet Proof (1920 film), starring Harry Carey
 Bulletproof (1988 film),  directed by Steve Carver and starring Gary Busey
 Bulletproof (1996 film), directed by Ernest R. Dickerson and starring Adam Sandler and Damon Wayans
 Bulletproof (2020 film), a documentary film
 Bulletproof (TV series), a 2018 British television drama series, created by and starring Noel Clarke and Ashley Walters

Music

Albums 
 Bulletproof (soundtrack), a 2005 soundtrack album by rapper 50 Cent from the game 50 Cent: Bulletproof
 Bulletproof (Julian Austin album), 2002
 Bulletproof (Brian Cadd and the Bootleg Family Band album), 2016 
 Bulletproof (Hush album), 2005
 Bulletproof (Reckless Kelly album), 2008
 Bulletproof (Hard Stuff album), 1972
 Bulletproof (1996 soundtrack)
 Bulletproof (Young Dolph album), 2017

Songs 
 "Bulletproof" (Dotter song), 2020
 "Bulletproof" (Godsmack song), 2018
 "Bulletproof" (La Roux song), 2009
 "Bulletproof" (Raheem DeVaughn song), 2009
 "Bulletproof" (Stan Walker song), 2013
 "Bulletproof", by Accept from their 1993 album Objection Overruled
 "Bulletproof", by Attila from their 2016 album Chaos
 "Bullet Proof", by Blue Rodeo from their 2002 album, Palace of Gold
 "Bulletproof", by Five Finger Death Punch from their 2009 album War Is the Answer
 "Bullet Proof", by George Clinton from his 1985 album, Some of My Best Jokes Are Friends
 "Bulletproof", by Kerli from her 2008 album Love Is Dead
 "Bullet Proof", by Morcheeba from their 1998 album, Big Calm
 "Bulletproof!", by Pop Will Eat Itself from their 1992 album, The Looks or the Lifestyle?
 "Bulletproof", by Queensrÿche from their 2015 album Condition Hüman
 "Bulletproof", by Rilo Kiley from their 2001 album Take Offs and Landings
 "Bulletproof", by the Afghan Whigs from their 1996 album Black Love
 "Bullet Proof", by the Goo Goo Dolls from their 1998 album, Dizzy Up the Girl
 "Bullet Proof.. I Wish I Was", by Radiohead from their 1995 album The Bends
 "Bullet Proof", by This Is the Kit  from their 2017 album, Moonshine Freeze

Other uses 
 50 Cent: Bulletproof, a 2005 video game starring various hip-hop artists
 Baldwin P. "Bulletproof" Vess, a character from the animated television series, C.O.P.S.
 Bullet-Proof (G.I. Joe), a fictional character in the G.I. Joe universe
 Bulletproof (comics), a comic book superhero from the Image Comics series Invincible
 Bulletproof Coffee, a brand of coffee drink
 Bulletproof, type of non-interactive zero-knowledge proof

See also 
 Bulletproof hosting, a euphemism for Internet hosting services that permit users to send spam e-mail and host illicit materials
 Bullet Proof Software, a video game developer now known as Blue Planet Software